Smother, smothered or smothering may refer to:
 Asphyxia, caused by obstructing air flow
 Smother (film), a 2008 American film
 Smother (album), a 2011 album by Wild Beasts
 Smothered (film), a 2016 film by John Schneider
Smothered, a 2019 TLC series
 "Smothered" (song), by nu metal band Spineshank
 Smothering (food), a cooking technique associated with Cajun and Louisiana Creole cuisine
 Smother play, a type of endplay in bridge
  Smother (TV series), a 2021 TV series set in Ireland
 An Australian rules football tactic, see One percenter (Australian rules football)#Smother

See also 
 Smothered mate, a checkmate in chess
 Smothers, a surname
 sMothered, a TLC TV series